Commander  was an officer in the Imperial Japanese Navy. He is notable for the humanitarian act of rescuing 442 enemy British and American sailors from the Java Sea in 1942.

Biography
Born in 1901, Kudō graduated from the Imperial Japanese Naval Academy in 1923 and was assigned to the light cruiser  as a midshipman, followed by the battleship Nagato in October 1924. He was commissioned in December 1924, was promoted to the rank of Second Lieutenant in 1926, and took his first command, the destroyer Hatakaze, in 1929.

Rescue of 442 enemy sailors
On March 2, 1942, Lieutenant Commander Kudō ordered Ikazuchi to rescue 442 survivors from the Royal Navy destroyer  and United States Navy destroyer . The survivors had been adrift for some 20 hours, in rafts and lifejackets or clinging to floats, many coated in oil and unable to see. Among the rescued was Sir Sam Falle, later a British diplomat.
This humanitarian decision by Lieutenant Commander Kudō placed the Ikazuchi at risk of submarine attack, and interfered with her fighting ability due to the sheer numbers of rescued sailors. The action was later the subject of books
and a 2007 TV programme.
According to the same documentary, humility and sadness sealed Kudō Shunsaku's lips after Ikazuchi was sunk with all its crew, thus he never told anyone about this heroic rescue.

Post-war life
After the war, Kudō left the navy and moved to Kawaguchi, Saitama. In 1979, he died of stomach cancer.

References

1901 births
1979 deaths
Deaths from stomach cancer
Deaths from cancer in Japan
Japanese military personnel of World War II
Imperial Japanese Navy officers
Japanese people of World War II
People of the Empire of Japan
Bushido
Japanese humanitarians
Kawaguchi, Saitama